Spit Junction is an urban locality in the suburb of  Mosman in Sydney, New South Wales, Australia. Spit Junction is in the local government area of the Municipality of Mosman and is part of the Lower North Shore.

History

E. and W. E. Brady bought  in this area in 1855 and it became a bush racetrack until the area was subdivided in 1902. The area had been known as Trafalgar Square, from the name of a block of shops built at the corner of Spit Road and Military Road.

Commercial area
Bridgepoint Shopping Centre is a small shopping mall located at Spit Junction. It features a supermarket, grocery shops, bookshop, gift shops, cafés, health practitioners, and offices.

References

Sydney localities
Mosman Council